The 2022 Washington State Senate elections took place as part of the biennial United States elections. Washington state voters elected state senators in 25 of the state's 49 Senate districts. The other 24 state senators were not up for re-election until the next biennial election in 2024. State senators served four-year terms in the Washington State Senate.

A top two primary election in August 2022 determined which candidates appear on the November 6 general election ballot. Each candidate was allowed to write in their party preference so that it appeared as they desired on the ballot.

Following the 2020 state senate elections, Democrats maintained control of the Senate, 28–21. Senators Sharon Brown (R), Reuven Carlyle (D), Mona Das (D), David Frockt (D), Jim Honeyford (R), and Tim Sheldon (D-MCC) are not seeking re-election. Additionally, Senator Jeannie Darneille (D) retired early and her seat will be up for election this cycle.

Predictions

Summary of Results by State Senate District
Districts not listed were not up for election in 2022.** Incumbent did not seek re-election.

Source:

Detailed Results

District 6

District 7

District 8

District 13

District 15

District 21

District 26

District 27

District 29

District 30

District 31

District 32

District 33

District 34

District 35

District 36

District 37

District 38

District 42

District 43

District 44

District 45

District 46

District 47

District 48

See also
 2022 United States elections
 2022 United States House of Representatives elections in Washington
 2022 United States Senate election in Washington
 2022 Washington House of Representatives election

References

External links 

 Map of Legislative Districts

Washington State Senate elections
2022 Washington (state) elections
Washington State Senate